Screwball Hotel is a 1988 American and British comedy film directed by Rafal Zielinski and starring Michael Bendetti, Andrew Zeller, Jeff Greenman, Corinne Wahl, and Kelly Monteith. It is the second sequel to Screwballs.

Premise
Three boys are expelled from military school and get jobs working at a hotel.

Cast
 Michael Bendetti as Mike
 Andrew Zeller as Herbie
 Jeff Greenman as Norman
 Corinne Wahl as Cherry Amour
 Kelly Monteith as Mr. Ebell

External links
 
 

1988 films
1980s sex comedy films
American sex comedy films
British sex comedy films
1980s English-language films
Films directed by Rafal Zielinski
Films scored by Nathan Wang
Films set in hotels
Films about beauty pageants
Universal Pictures films
Teen sex comedy films
1988 comedy films
1980s American films
1980s British films